Bamburi Cement Limited is an industrial company in Kenya specialising in cement and concrete. The company has operations in Bamburi suburb of Mombasa, it is headquartered in Nairobi and its stock is listed on the Nairobi Securities Exchange.

Overview 
Bamburi Cement is the largest manufacturer of cement in Eastern Africa, with its cement plant in Mombasa being the second largest cement plant in sub-Saharan Africa. This has given it the title of largest manufacturing export earner in Kenya. As of December 2015, the company's total assets were valued at US$420 million, with shareholders' equity of about US$297 million.

History 
Bamburi Cement was founded in 1951 by Felix Mandl as a partnership between Cementia Holding and Blue Circle in British Kenya. production from its Mombasa plant in 1954. In 1998, Bamburi opened a clinker grinding plant in

Subsidiaries and investments 
The companies that comprise Bamburi Cement include, but are not limited, to the following:
 Bamburi Cement – Nairobi, Kenya – The flagship company of the group. This unit engages in the production of cement.
 Bamburi Special Products – Nairobi, Kenya – 100% Shareholding – This subsidiary is dedicated to manufacturing of concrete paving blocks and ready mix concrete.
 Lafarge Eco systems – Nairobi, Kenya – 100% Shareholding – The environmental and rehabilitation arm of the group.
 HimCem Holdings – Saint Helier, Jersey – 100% Shareholding – An investment holding company.
 East African Portland Cement Company – Athi River, Kenya – 12.5% Shareholding – A Kenya-based cement manufacturer listed on the NSE.

Shareholding 
The shares of Bamburi Cement are traded on the main market segment of the Nairobi Securities Exchange, under the ticker symbol: BAMB. The shareholding in the company's stock as at 31 December 2016 was as depicted in the table below:

Fincem Holding Limited and Kencem Holding Limited are subsidiaries of LafargeHolcim. This gives LafargeHolcim 58.6% control of Bamburi Cement.

Environmental concerns 
During its early years, cement production grew from 1.2 million tons to 25 million tons. This made the Bamburi quarries inhospitable arid wasteland with brackish water. In 1959, the company engaged Rene Haller to beautify the area. In the 1971 Haller embarked on the reforestation project leading to the formation of Haller Park. The park is tourist attraction with a wide range of flora and fauna.

The company has since aimed to convert barren landscape of disused limestone quarries into vibrant and diverse ecosystem of forest, grasslands and ponds.

Sponsorship

Bamburi Rugby Super Series 
The Bamburi Rugby Super Series is an East African Rugby union competition with eight teams in total, five teams from Kenya, two from Uganda and one from Tanzania. It is closely based on the Super Rugby competition in the southern hemisphere. Games take place at the RFUEA Ground in Nairobi, Friedkin Recreation Centre in Arusha and the Kyadondo Grounds, Kampala.

See also 
 Cement in Africa
 Haller Park

References

External links 
 Bamburi Cement at MBendi
 Profile of Bamburi Cement at myStocks KE

Cement companies of Kenya
Companies listed on the Nairobi Securities Exchange
Manufacturing companies based in Nairobi
Kenyan brands